"I Shall Be Free No. 10" is a song by American singer-songwriter Bob Dylan, which was released as the fifth track on his fourth studio album Another Side of Bob Dylan (1964). The song was written by Dylan and produced by Tom Wilson. It was recorded on June 9, 1964, and released on Another Side of Bob Dylan on August 8, 1964.

Background and recording
According to Bob Dylan's biographer Clinton Heylin's analysis of Dylan's drafts of lyrics from the period, "I Shall Be Free No. 10" was "composed in stages". The lyrics were likely started at the Mayfair Hotel in London in May 1964. They were finished during a week-long stay in the Greek village of Vernilya later that month, after Dylan had travelled across Europe with friends and Nico. Several other songs, including "To Ramona", "It Ain't Me Babe" and "All I Really Want to Do" were completed in Vernilya. Some of the lyrics for the "To Ramona" were originally in "I Shall Be Free No. 10".

Dylan recorded 14 songs between 7:00 pm and 10:00 pm on June 9, at Studio A, Columbia Recording Studios, New York, with Tom Wilson as producer. Of these, 11 tracks were selected for his fourth studio album, Another Side of Bob Dylan.

Two of the five takes of "I Shall Be Free No. 10" were edited together for the album version. It was released as the fifth track on side one  of Another Side of Bob Dylan on August 8, 1964. An alternate version, with an with an extra verse, was issued on the  Highway 61 Interactive interactive CD-ROM in 1995. In 2010, a mono version was released on The Original Mono Recordings. According to his official website, Dylan has never performed the song in concert. The song is a talking blues, a form popularized by Chris Bouchillon and used by Woody Guthrie.

Composition and lyrical interpretation
"I Shall Be Free No. 10", like "I Shall Be Free" from Dylan's eponymous debut studio album Bob Dylan (1962), derives from earlier songs such as Lead Belly's "We Shall Be Free", recorded with Guthrie and Sonny Terry in 1944. John H. Cowley traced stanzas from "We Shall Be Free" and similar songs back to the mid-ninetenth century. Early recorded variations include "You Shall" (1927) by Frank Stokes and Dan Sane (performing as the Beale Street Sheikhs), and "What a Time" (1928) by Jim Jackson. Critic Michael Gray noted similarities in the lyrics of Jackson's song to both the content of the Lead Belly track, and the lyrical and instrumental delivery by Dylan of his own "I Shall be Free" songs. However, Jackson's version had not been released by 1964. Gray says that the title "I Shall Be Free No. 10" is an explicit acknowledgement by Dylan of "the many antecedents and variants and versions" of the older songs.

The song opens with "an affirmation of [Dylan's] ordinariness". Critic Jim Curtis wrote that "you can practically see [Dylan] grinning" on the track.

Later in the song, Dylan, who had been receiving critical acclaim for his songwriting, sings "Yippee! I'm a poet, and I know it/ Hope I don't blow it". Literature scholar Timothy Hampton wrote that by referring to the critical recognition with "doggerel verse", Dylan "both acknowledges his genius and undercuts his claim to serious purpose at the same time." Hampton argued that "Nowhere is Dylan's status as artist, media figure, pop hero, and political spokesperson evoked with more self-awareness or complexity than in these lines."

Author John Nogowski remarked that the song provides a "welcome bit of Guthriesque comic relief" after the "verbal maelstom" of Chimes of Freedom" which precedes it on the album. Similarly, critic Andy Gill wrote that "Dylan presumably felt it might be prudent to lighten things up" after "Chimes of Freedom".

Craig McGregor of The Sydney Morning Herald interpreted Another Side of Bob Dylan as a set of parodies of targets including the Beatles and Alfred Hitchcock movies. He considered "I Shall Be Free No. 10" to be a parody of the "throw-away lines and slightly folksy flavour of Woody Guthrie, Jack Elliott and half a dozen other talking blues experts." However, author Donald Brown noted that although Dylan's previous two albums had songs that referenced social and political issues, the only contemporary mentions on Another Side of Bob Dylan were in "I Shall Be Free No. 10": to world heavyweight boxing champion Cassius Clay, conservative Senator Barry Goldwater, and the space race  between the United States and the Soviet Union.

Critical reception
In a generally negative review of the album, Grover Lewis of the Fort Worth Star-Telegram was positive about only two tracks; "I Shall Be Free No. 10" was described as "a zany surrealist-flavored improvisation", and highlighted, along with "Motorpsycho Nitemare", as tracks that "shows flashes of the same rocking drive and ambition that sparked [Dylan's] initial recordings". In 1976, William Florence of The Times Herald wrote that on Another Side of Bob Dylan, "a wild sense of humor breaks into the open really for the first time", with those two tracks representing "classic examples of this more-relaxed and at-ease songwriter".

The reviewer for the Herald Express considered that Another Side of Bob Dylan established Dylan as the most important folk singer" since Woody Guthrie, and included "I Shall Be Free No. 10" amongst their favuorite traks on the album. Author John Nogowski remarked that the song as "welcome bit of Guthriesque comic relief" after the "verbal maelstom" of Chimes of Freedom" which precedes it on the album. 
Praising Dylan's "effortless delivery", Nogowski give the song an "A-" rating. It was ranked 16th on a list of the top 20 Dylan songs in Dave Marsh and Kevin Stein's The Book of Rock Lists (1982).

Credits and personnel
Credits adapted from the Bob Dylan All the Songs: The Story Behind Every Track book.

Musician
 Bob Dylanvocals, rhythm guitar, harmonica

Technical personnel
 Tom Wilsonproducer
 Roy Halee and Fred Caterosound engineering

Notes

References 
Bibliography

Citations

External links
Lyrics at Bob Dylan's official website
Audio of the track at Bob Dylan's official YouTube channel

Songs written by Bob Dylan
Bob Dylan songs
1964 songs
Song recordings produced by Tom Wilson (record producer)